David Wood (born April 7, 1976) is an American evangelical apologist, YouTube personality, and the head of the Acts 17 Apologetics ministry. He is most well known for his YouTube videos in which he opposes and criticizes Islam, particularly Islamic views on theology and morality, as well as the Quran in general and Muhammad as a person, using Islamic sources such as the Quran and hadith.

Early life, incarceration and education
In a video testimony about Wood's conversion to Christianity he has stated that he was an atheist in his youth, and that he had run-ins with the law by breaking into homes and later went as far as smashing his father's head in with a hammer at the age of 18 in an attempt on his life, claiming a belief that morality was merely societal rules that were beneath him. He also said that after the assault on his father, Wood was diagnosed with antisocial personality disorder and was sentenced to ten years in prison for malicious wounding.  While in prison, he said, he was confronted with a fellow prisoner named Randy who was a devout Christian. Wood said he often challenged Randy's Christian beliefs, initially claiming that Randy was only a Christian because he was born into a primarily Christian society, specifically the United States. Wood stated that, while in prison, he and Randy frequently fasted, with Wood attempting to "beat" Randy at fasting, which eventually resulted in Wood being placed into solitary confinement under observation due to concerns over Wood potentially attempting to commit suicide by starvation. During this time, he began to read the Bible and participate in various Bible study programs in order to respond to Randy's rebuttals (thus "beating" him) but it eventually led Wood to convert to Christianity in 1996.

He said that after five years between jail and prison, he was released in 2000 and went to college at Old Dominion University where he earned a bachelor's degree. He later earned a doctorate in philosophy from Fordham University. Wood wrote that while he was studying at Old Dominion University, he was challenged to convert to Islam by his friend, Nabeel Qureshi (an American Ahmadiyya Muslim of Pakistani descent), and that he went about investigating the life of Muhammad using the earliest sources, including Ibn Ishaq's Life of Muhammad (the earliest extant biography of Muhammad); the hadith collections of Sahih al-Bukhari and Sahih Muslim (considered by Sunni Muslims to be the two most reliable or sahih collections of Muhammad's statements, actions, and example); and the History of the Prophets and Kings by Al-Tabari (one of Islam's greatest historians). Wood said that he concluded that the Quran and Muhammad's example did not simply describe violence in the past (as in the Christian Bible per his assertion), but rather commanded ongoing violence.  As a result, Wood said he then became a Christian apologist, and that his roommate Nabeel later did so as well.

Christian apologetics
Wood has participated in public debates with Muslims and atheists, including debates with Muslim scholars like Shabir Ally. Wood was invited on several ABN shows, in inter-religious discussions against atheism and Islam, where among other things he regularly appears on the Aramaic Broadcasting Network. He has produced YouTube videos presenting his views on religion. Writing for The Catholic World Report, William Kilpatrick says that Wood has made "highly effective short videos that set the record straight on areas of Christian-Muslim disagreement," and that he "comes across as the quintessence of calm, controlled manhood. Armed with a winning sense of humor, a razor-sharp mind, and a ton of knowledge, Wood doesn’t even have to raise his voice to make his points."

In 2013, Wood completed his Ph.D. from Fordham University, publishing his dissertation Surprised by suffering: Hume, Draper, and the Bayesian argument from evil.

Wood opposed the Park51 Islamic Center, arguing that it was not meant to honor the victims' families, but instead was a symbol of Islamic victory and named Cordoba House in memory of the Islamic conquest of Spain by the Umayyad Caliphate which later formed the Caliphate of Córdoba. Wood has been described as part of the counter-jihad movement.

In 2010 Wood was arrested outside Dearborn, Michigan, after preaching at an Arab festival and being charged with a misdemeanor of disturbing the peace, but was later acquitted. In May 2013, the City of Dearborn was required to post a public apology to be maintained on the City's website for three years and pay $300,000 to Wood and his three compatriots.

Wood wrote a polemic regarding the work of Richard Carrier which he titled "Good 'n' Senseless Without God: A Critical Review of Richard Carrier's New Book, Sense & Goodness Without God". Richard Carrier responded to the review with an essay entitled "On the Deceptions of David Wood", in which he argued that Wood misrepresented his arguments and that his review was full of diatribes. Wood has also written journals arguing against the views of Dan Barker.

Wood is a member of the Society of Christian Philosophers and the Evangelical Philosophical Society.

On 26 May 2022, Wood announced his decision to delete his YouTube channel at some point in June of the same year, due to what he saw as an increase in censorship and restriction of free speech from the side of YouTube. Wood has stated that he will establish a website to serve as his new base of online operations and content creation, but has encouraged fans to re-upload his videos onto their own YouTube channels if they wished to keep them on the site. On 3 July, he changed his plans in response to Hatun Tash being robbed and arrested at Speaker’s Corner, opting instead to clear his channel and transfer ownership to Hatun Tash. On 4 July 2022, he joined a livestream which showed him deleting his videos.

Since then he has created 3 new YouTube channels and Thaddeus from Reasoned Answers (along with others) reposts his deleted content back on YouTube (check external links).

Personal life
He met his wife Marie, then an agnostic while in university; she also became a Christian. They have five sons, two of whom suffer from centronuclear myopathy.

See also
Christian apologetics
Nabeel Qureshi (author)

References

External links

Philosophy Underground
Acts 17 Polemics (His YouTube channel)
Apologetics Roadshow (His YouTube channel)
The David Wood Archives (YouTube Channel with his old videos) 
Reasoned Answers
Apologetics Archive (Website with all David’s deleted videos)

1976 births
Living people
21st-century American theologians
21st-century evangelicals
American critics of Islam
American evangelicals
American prisoners and detainees
American YouTubers
Christian apologists
Christian critics of Islam
Converts to Christianity from atheism or agnosticism
Counter-jihad activists
Evangelical theologians
Fordham University alumni
Former atheist critics of atheism
Old Dominion University alumni
Place of birth missing (living people)
Critics of Islam